Middle Courtgaon or Madhya Courtgaon is one of the main villages that make up Munshiganj Paurashava, the headquarters of Munshiganj Sadar Upazila, Bangladesh.

References

Munshiganj District